USD Pont Donnaz Hône Arnad Evançon is an Italian association football club, based in Pont-Saint-Martin, Aosta Valley. The club plays its home matches at the 2,500-seat Stadio Crestella. It currently plays in Serie D.

History 
PDHAE was founded in 2013 by merging USD Pont-Donnaz and USD Hone Arnad. The club finished first in the Eccellenza Piedmont-Aosta Valley for the 2020-2021 season, earning promotion to Serie D for the first time in its history.

References

External links
Official website
Soccerway profile

Football clubs in Piedmont and Aosta Valley